Jeffrey Kramer (born July 15, 1945) is an American film and television actor and producer.

Life and career
Kramer was born in New York City and grew up in Teaneck, New Jersey, graduating from Teaneck High School with the Class of 1963, before attending Ithaca College.

He made his first appearance on the TV series Barney Miller starring in the episode Snow Job as the "Stick Up Man". Then during the year he made an appearance in his first film, the Oscar-winning horror/thriller movie Jaws, playing Deputy Hendricks; he reprised the role in the sequel Jaws 2 in 1978; in 1976, he guest starred in Baretta. He appeared in the Joe Dante cult classic Hollywood Boulevard; during the credit sequence as a girl is walking down the boulevard, when Jeffrey's name pops up, there is a Jaws poster in the visible background. He appeared in the horror film Halloween II playing Graham, a dentist who examines dead Ben Tramer's body, believing him to be Michael Myers. And, during the year, he appeared in Heartbeeps as "Party Butler Robot" in the film. He then made an appearance on Happy Days starring in two episodes, The People vs. the Fonz as "Martin Smith" and Fonzie the Flatfoot as "Lefty". In 1985, he starred in Santa Claus: The Movie as "Towzer"; and finally made his last appearance in Ally McBeal in 1997 as a pedestrian. His most recent film is The 'burbs. Kramer has also produced many independent projects with young filmmakers.

Awards

Filmography

Actor
Barney Miller (1975) (TV series) - Stick Up Man
Jaws (1975) (as Jeffrey C. Kramer) - Deputy Lenny Hendricks
Baretta (1976) (TV series) - Junkie
Speeding? (1976) (Short Film) - Speeder Directed by - Mitchell Block 
Hollywood Boulevard (1976) - Patrick Hobby
Chico and the Man (1976) (TV series) - Rojo
Stick Around (1977) (TV) - Ed
You Light Up My Life (1977) - Background Singer
Jaws 2 (1978) - Deputy Jeff Hendricks
Soap (1978) (TV series) - Policeman #2
Struck by Lightning (1979) (TV series) - Ted Stein
M*A*S*H (1977–1980) (TV series) - Driver
Laverne & Shirley (1978–1981) (TV series) - Jeff
Halloween II (1981) - Graham
Heartbeeps (1981) - Party Butler Robot
The Incredible Hulk (1982) (TV series) - Marty Gibbs
Inside the Love House (1983) - Rick
Happy Days (1975–1984) (TV series) - Lefty / Martin Smith
American Dreamer (1984) - Gold Buddy #3
Santa Claus: The Movie (1985) - Towzer
Clue (1985) - The Motorist
Hero and the Terror (1988) - Dwight
The 'burbs (1989) - Voice-over actor (voice)
Ally McBeal (1997) (TV series) - Pedestrian

Producer
Armed & Famous (2007) (TV series) (executive producer) (1 episode)
Bigfoot Presents: Meteor and the Mighty Monster Trucks (2006) (TV series) (co-executive producer) (unknown episodes)
The Big Empty (2003) (executive producer)
A Time for Dancing (2000) (producer)
The Practice (1997–1999) (TV series) (co-executive producer) (56 episodes) (producer)
Ally (1999) (TV series) (co-executive producer) (unknown episodes)
Ally McBeal (1997–1999) (TV series) (co-executive producer) (8 episodes)
Chicago Hope (1994) (TV series) (producer) (##unknown episodes##)

References

External links

1945 births
Male actors from New York (state)
American male film actors
American male television actors
Emmy Award winners
Living people
People from Teaneck, New Jersey